Parasite is a peer-reviewed open access scientific journal covering all aspects of human and animal parasitology. The journal publishes reviews, articles, and short notes. It is published by EDP Sciences and is an official journal of the Société Française de Parasitologie. It is published by EDP Sciences and the editor-in-chief is Jean-Lou Justine (National Museum of Natural History, Paris). The journal was established in 1923 as Annales de Parasitologie Humaine et Comparée and obtained its current title in 1994, with volume numbering restarting at 1.

Abstracting and indexing
The journal is abstracted and indexed in:

According to the Journal Citation Reports, the journal has a 2020 impact factor of 3.000, ranking it 13th out of 42 journals in the category "Parasitology".

References

External links
 
 French Society of Parasitology

Creative Commons Attribution-licensed journals
Open access journals
Publications established in 1923
English-language journals
Parasitology journals
EDP Sciences academic journals